Eugen Habermann (19 October 1884 in Tallinn, Estonia – 22 September 1944 in the Baltic Sea) was an Estonian architect.

Examples of his work

References

1884 births
1944 deaths
Architects from Tallinn
People from the Governorate of Estonia
Modernist architects
20th-century Estonian architects